Vulsor is a genus of araneomorph spiders in the family Viridasiidae, first described by Eugène Simon in 1889. Originally placed with the wandering spiders, it was moved to the Viridasiidae in 2015.

Species
 it contains eight species:
Vulsor bidens Simon, 1889 (type) – Comoros, Mayotte
Vulsor isaloensis (Ono, 1993) – Madagascar
Vulsor occidentalis Mello-Leitão, 1922 – Brazil
Vulsor penicillatus Simon, 1896 – Madagascar
Vulsor quartus Strand, 1907 – Madagascar
Vulsor quintus Strand, 1907 – Madagascar
Vulsor septimus Strand, 1907 – Madagascar
Vulsor sextus Strand, 1907 – Madagascar

See also
Viridasius

References

Araneomorphae genera
Taxa named by Eugène Simon
Viridasiidae